The family name Whelan  is an anglicisation of the Irish surname Ó Faoláin. The surname originates from the Middle Irish  (plural Uí Faeláin) the name of the 10th to 11th century ruling dynasty of the Déisi, a population group inhabiting the area of the modern county of Waterford and County Kilkenny in the early medieval period.

The word  is derived from the Old Irish word faelán meaning a young (small) wolf; -án being of the diminutive suffix in Irish. Ó (anglicised as O') derives from the Old Irish úa, meaning "grandson", or more figuratively "patrilineal descendant". The patronym that follows is always in the genitive case, in accordance with Irish grammatical rules, and is normally marked by an "i" following the final vowel. Therefore, the name Faelán, becomes Úa Faeláin as a patronym in Middle Irish, from which is derived Ó Faoláin in Modern Irish, of which in turn Whelan, Phelan, O'Phelan etc. are anglicisations.

According to the legendary history of Ireland, about 300 A.D., the Déisi settled on the site of Dungarvan, County Waterford. In the 12th and 13th centuries, during the early Anglo-Norman period, records of a political nature relating to the Déisi and the descendants of the Uí Faeláin dynastic group decline.

The Faelán referred to is Faelán mac Cormac, who is recorded in the Annals of Inishfallen as having succeeded his father as king of the Déisi in 966. The first person referred to as úa Faeláin is his grandson Mothla mac Domnall, or Mothla úa Faeláin, who was king of the Déisi until his death at the Battle of Clontarf in 1014, and whose head is recorded in the Annals of Ulster as having been interred with Brian Ború in Armagh. During this period however, Irish patronyms had not yet petrified into surnames proper.

According to the Annals of the Four Masters:

The Age of Christ, 1170.

M1170.11

Robert Fitz Stephen and Richard, son of Gilbert, i.e. Earl Strongbow, came from England into Ireland with a numerous force, and many knights and archers, in the army of Mac Murchadha [Dermot MacMurrough], to contest Leinster for him, and to disturb the Irish of Ireland in general; and Mac Murchadha gave his daughter to the Earl Strongbow for coming into his army. They took Loch Garman [Wexford town; a stone walled Norse settlement], and entered Port-Lairge [Waterford town; a Norse settlement] by force; and they took Gillemaire, the officer of the fortress, and Ua Faelain, lord of the Deisi, and his son, and they killed seven hundred persons there.

By the beginning of the thirteenth century, most of the territory of the Déisi was absorbed into the Anglo-Norman colony. The surname Whelan remains common in County Waterford and in the adjoining part of Co. Kilkenny, particularly in the barony of Iverk.

The earliest anglicised forms of the Ó Faoláin name were Felan, Faelan, Hyland, with many other similar variants, including Whelan and Phelan in Cos Waterford and Kilkenny. Whelan and Whalen are the most prevalent forms in modern times, and combined are placed seventy-ninth in the list of the hundred most common surnames in Ireland. With Phelan added, the name takes forty-fourth place. Another meaning for Whelan was originated from the earliest version of Irish, the meaning was "clan of the wolf".

Whelans
 Aileen Whelan – English footballer
 Anto Whelan – Irish footballer
 Arleen Whelan – American actress
 Bill Whelan – composer of Riverdance
 Brian Whelan – painter, author and filmmaker; paintings in public/private collections worldwide; 3 books published and one film in the UK National Gallery of Art
 Charles Wheelan – American author
 Charlie Whelan – served as a special advisor in Her Majesty's Treasury under Gordon Brown
 Chris Whelan – Middlesex cricketer
 Christine Whelan – American author, journalist and commentator
 Ciara Whelan - Irish television presenter
 Ciarán Whelan – Irish Gaelic footballer
 Dave Whelan – Former professional footballer with Blackburn Rovers and the current owner of Wigan Athletic
 David Whelan – English golf instructor and former golfer
 Dutee A. Whelan, American politician
 Edward Whelan – Canadian politician
 Edward Whelan – A member of the O'Shea and Whelan family
 Elizabeth Whelan – American author, epidemiologist, and consumer advocate
 Emily Whelan – Irish footballer
 Eugene Whelan – Canadian politician
 Fern Whelan – English footballer
 Gary Whelan – actor (played Brendan Kearney in Ballykissangel amongst other things)
 Gavan Whelan – drummer for the band James
 Gemma Whelan – English actress and comedian
 George J. Whelan – former mayor of San Francisco
 Glenn Whelan – Republic of Ireland international footballer
 Gloria Whelan – American author, winner of the National Book Award for Children's Literature (2000)
 Hannah Whelan – British gymnast, competed at the 2008 and 2012 Olympics
 Heather Whelan - Irish cricketer
 James R. Whelan - journalist and educator
 Jill Whelan – American actress
 Jim Whelan (1948–2017) - American politician
 John W. Whelan- American politician
 Jordan Whelan – American musician
 Julia Whelan – American actress
 Leo Whelan (1892–1956) - Irish painter
 Liam Whelan – former Manchester United footballer who died in the Munich Air Disaster. Also known as Billy Whelan
 Máire Whelan – Attorney General of Ireland
 Marcus Whelan – Australian Rules footballer
 Marty Whelan- Irish radio personality
 Matthew Whelan – Indigenous Australian Rules footballer
 Michael Whelan – American artist  
 Nicky Whelan – Australian actress from Neighbours
 Noel Whelan – Former Premiership footballer
 Nuala O'Faolain – Irish journalist
 Patrick J. Whelan – Visionary pioneer of financial electronic platforms
 Patrick J. Whelan – tailor who was hanged for assassinating D'Arcy McGee
 Patrick Whelan - Irish volunteer killed in the Easter Rising of 1916
 Paul Whelan (politician) (1943–2019), New South Wales state politician
 Paul F. Whelan, Irish academic 
 Paul Whelan (security director), US citizen and corporate security director arrested in Russia in late 2018 on accusations of being a spy
 Peter Whelan - academic lawyer
 Ronnie Whelan – played for Liverpool Football Club and is the son of Ronnie Whelan, Sr. who was also a footballer
 Seán Ó Faoláin – born John Francis Whelan, writer
 Thomas Whelan – Irish IRA Volunteer, one of The Forgotten Ten
 Thomas J. Whelan – Irish-American mayor
 Thomas J. Whelan – American judge
 Tom Whelan – American football player
 Tommy Whelan – American football player
 Tony Whelan – former Manchester United footballer
 Wendy Whelan – American ballet dancer and associate artistic director of New York City Ballet
 Donan Whelan- Actor and restaurant manager

Characters
 Abby Whelan - fictional character on Scandal

See also 
 Wheelan (surname)

References

 Annals of the Four Masters

Surnames
Irish families
Surnames of Irish origin
English-language surnames
Anglicised Irish-language surnames